Banduragoda Grama Niladhari Division is a Grama Niladhari Division of the Mirigama Divisional Secretariat of Gampaha District of Western Province, Sri Lanka. It has Grama Niladhari Division Code 35.

Banduragoda is a surrounded by the Ihala Madithiyawala, Rassapana, Ullalapola East, Wattemulla, Gaspe, Gaspe Pahalagama, Keppitiwalana, Hangawatta and Gaspe Pahalagama Grama Niladhari Divisions.

Demographics

Ethnicity 

The Banduragoda Grama Niladhari Division has a Sinhalese majority (98.2%). In comparison, the Mirigama Divisional Secretariat (which contains the Banduragoda Grama Niladhari Division) has a Sinhalese majority (94.7%)

Religion 

The Banduragoda Grama Niladhari Division has a Buddhist majority (94.4%). In comparison, the Mirigama Divisional Secretariat (which contains the Banduragoda Grama Niladhari Division) has a Buddhist majority (93.5%)

Gallery

References 

Gampaha District
Grama Niladhari divisions of Sri Lanka